Yellampet is a village and panchayat in Rangareddy district, TS, India. It comes under Medchal mandal.

Yellampet is a good location in medchal division on in panchayat... total 800 change for acr land will available in yellampet  and it have lot of developed area special it located some industry in the yellampet vill PHI, Sree ram DRS Hindustan liver company Cuba cold JK Seed sang am health care And ext like this type of in allocated in the yellampet but there is no proper ruler in the village.

Villages in Ranga Reddy district